Juan Francisco Sarasti Jaramillo (30 July 1938 – 25 February 2021) was a Colombian Roman Catholic archbishop.

Biography
Sarasti Jaramillo was born in Cali, Colombia and was ordained to the priesthood in 1963. He served as titular bishop of Egara and as auxiliary bishop of the Roman Catholic Archdiocese of Cali, Colombia, from 1978 to 1983. He then served as bishop of the Roman Catholic Diocese of Barrancabermeja, Colombia from 1983 to 1993 and as archbishop of the Roman Catholic Archdiocese of Ibagué, Colombia from 1993 to 2002. He served as archbishop of the Cali Archdiocese from 2002 to 2011.

Sarasti Jaramillo died from complications from COVID-19 in his hometown of Cali during the COVID-19 pandemic in Colombia on 25 February 2021, at the age of 82.

Notes

External links

1938 births
2021 deaths
21st-century Roman Catholic archbishops in Colombia
Deaths from the COVID-19 pandemic in Colombia
20th-century Roman Catholic archbishops in Colombia
Roman Catholic bishops of Cali
Eudist bishops